Tampines West MRT station is an underground Mass Rapid Transit station on the Downtown line in Tampines, Singapore. It is located at Tampines Avenue 4, near the junction with Tampines Avenue 1.

The station is located near some schools such as Temasek Polytechnic, Junyuan Primary School and East View Primary School, as well as SAFRA Tampines, and to the housing estates of Tampines Palmspring and Tampines Polyview.

History

Contract 926 for the design and construction of Tampines West MRT Station and associated tunnels was awarded to Cooperativa Muratori & Cementisti - C.M.C di Ravenna at an estimated sum of S$226.92 million in July 2011. On 29 January 2012, the signage of Tampines Palmspring was demolished. Construction of the station started in February that year, with the noise barriers placed. Road realignment has begun that June and lasted till January 2016.

The station opened on 21 October 2017, as announced by the Land Transport Authority on 31 May that year.

As part of Operation Quicksand, a simulated terror attack on 27 January 2019 was carried out at this station.

References

External links

Railway stations in Singapore opened in 2017
Tampines
Mass Rapid Transit (Singapore) stations